Saygafar (Säyğäfär) is a rural locality (a village) in Akmurunsky Selsoviet, Baymaksky District, Bashkortostan, Russia. The population was 630 as of 2010. There are 10 streets.

Geography 
Saygafar is located 29 km southwest of Baymak (the district's administrative centre) by road. Yumashevo is the nearest rural locality.

References 

Rural localities in Baymaksky District